Friary United Reformed church is a church on Musters Road in West Bridgford, Nottingham, built between 1898 and 1901. It is a Grade II listed building.

History

The congregation came from Friar Lane Chapel which was founded in 1827.  In 1897 the congregation moved to West Bridgford. They were joined by members from other Nottingham Congregational churches including Castle Gate Congregational Centre and Park Hill Congregational Church. 

The new church was officially opened in September 1901. The first baptism took place soon after with Doris Edith Whitemore 1901 - 1995 being the first female and only the second person to be baptized at the Church. She later became a member of the Church Choir.

Queen's Walk Congregational Church amalgamated in 1970 and in 1972, Friary Church joined the United Reformed Church.

Organ

The church had a pipe organ by Charles Lloyd and Co dating from 1885. A specification of this organ can be found on the National Pipe Organ Register. In the mid 1990s, this organ was transferred to the Cathedral of the Holy Cross in Lusaka, Zambia.

References

Churches in Nottingham
Churches completed in 1901
Grade II listed churches in Nottinghamshire
United Reformed churches in Nottinghamshire
West Bridgford